Caribou Mountain may refer to:

Caribou Mountain (Franklin County, Maine), a mountain on the Canada-United States border
Caribou Mountain (Idaho), highest point of the Caribou Mountains range
Caribou Mountain (Temagami), a mountain in Temagami, Ontario, Canada